Sri Paduka Dato' Bendahara Sri Maharaja Tun Muhammad ibni Almarhum Dato' Bendahara Paduka Raja Tun Abdul Majid (died 1803) was the 22nd Bendahara of the Johor Sultanate and also the second Raja Bendahara of the Pahang Kingdom who reigned from 1802 to 1803.

Born as Engku Sentul, he is the second son of Bendahara Tun Abdul Majid, who succeeded on the death of his father in 1802.

During the reign of his father, Tun Muhammad settled at Chenor. When the news of the murder of his brother, Tun Abdul Mutalib, reached him, Tun Muhammad hurried to Pekan with his troops. At Pekan, he found that the murderer, Temenggong Abdul Jamal had left for Riau. In spite of his father's attempt to restrain him, he followed the Temenggong. On his arrival at Riau, he found that the demented Abdul Jamal was dead.

Tun Muhammad decided to settle at Riau, and when his father died in 1802, the Sultan installed him as the next Bendahara. The new minister then set sail for Pahang in 1803. While he was crossing from Tioman Island to Endau, his boat was wrecked in a storm and he, and one of his wives trapped in a cabin and perished. He was known posthumously as Marhum Mangkat di Laut ('the late chief who died at sea') after his death, having had issue a son and a daughter.

References

Bibliography
 

Sultans of Pahang
1803 deaths
19th-century monarchs in Asia
House of Bendahara of Johor